Phellodon implicatus is a species of tooth fungus in the family Bankeraceae. It was described as new to science in 1986 from collections made in Florida. It is one of the few Phellodon species known to possess clamp connections in its hyphae.

References

External links

Fungi described in 1986
Fungi of the United States
Inedible fungi
implicatus
Fungi without expected TNC conservation status